William Selby (1738–1798) was an American composer, organist and choirmaster.

Early life
Born in England, Selby was the third known son of Joseph and Mary Selby of London. Beginning at the age of 17, he held several positions in London as organist. Selby emigrated to Boston, Massachusetts.

Career 
In 1774, Selby became the organist at Trinity Church in Newport, Rhode Island. Three years later, Selby became organist at King's Chapel in Boston where he organized the first colonial music festival.

Selby's surviving works include two voluntaries and one Fugue for the organ, a lesson in C for the harpsichord, and an anthem for Thanksgiving Day. In addition to his musical endeavors, he managed a grocery and liquor shop.

References

English composers
British emigrants to the Thirteen Colonies
American male composers
American composers
1738 births
1789 deaths
American organists
American male organists
People of colonial Massachusetts
18th-century American composers
18th-century male musicians
18th-century keyboardists
Musicians from Newport, Rhode Island